Christian "Chris" Muomaife (born December 20, 1987) is a Nigerian professional football player, who currently is playing at ÍF Fuglafjørður in the best faroese division. He used to play for the Danish team Viborg FF.

External links
Career statistics

1987 births
Living people
Nigerian footballers
Nigerian expatriate footballers
Viborg FF players
Danish Superliga players
Expatriate men's footballers in Denmark
Association football forwards